Edem Muradosilov was a Soviet sprint canoer who competed in the early 1980s. He won three medals at the ICF Canoe Sprint World Championships with two silvers (C-2 500 m: 1981, C-2 10000 m: 1982) and a bronze (C-2 1000 m: 1981).

References

Living people
Soviet male canoeists
Year of birth missing (living people)
ICF Canoe Sprint World Championships medalists in Canadian